"I'm Gonna Love You Too" is a song written by Joe B. Mauldin, Niki Sullivan and Norman Petty, originally recorded by Buddy Holly in 1957 and released as a single in 1958. It was covered 20 years later by American new wave band Blondie and released as the lead single in the U.S. from their multi-platinum 1978 album Parallel Lines.

Song history
There is controversy about the authorship of the song. Jerry Allison has stated that Buddy Holly was the actual author of the song. William Ruhlmann noted:

The song is credited to Joe B. Mauldin, Holly's bass player; Norman Petty, his producer; and Nikki Sullivan, his sometime rhythm guitarist (who was not heard on the recording). There have long been questions about the songwriting credits assigned to the original songs Holly recorded, and Jerry Allison, his drummer, has gone on record stating that "I'm Gonna Love You Too" actually was written primarily by Holly, with Allison composing the bridge. Certainly the song sounds characteristic of the man who wrote "That'll Be the Day." It is another up-tempo number with an infectious tune and boastful lyrics that only thinly veil heartbreak.
Of the song's credited authors, two (Mauldin and Sullivan) were members of Holly's band The Crickets; the third, Petty, was Holly's first manager and also his recording engineer.

Holly included the song on his self-titled second album, Buddy Holly. It was released as a single on Coral Records, but failed to crack the Billboard Hot 100. (Buddy Holly continued to sell regionally in the upper midwest after his death and when it rereleased, "I'm Gonna Love You Too" was a substantial 'regional' hit in Minneapolis and surrounding markets in 1964.)
Ironically, when the song was recorded an actual cricket was in the studio. As the song is ending and fading out, you can hear the cricket chirp a couple of times.

Blondie version

The biggest hit from Blondie's previous album, Plastic Letters, was "Denis", a cover of Randy & the Rainbows' 1963 song "Denise", so Chrysalis Records chose "I'm Gonna Love You Too" as the lead single to promote Blondie's Parallel Lines in the U.S. This turned out to be a miscalculation as "I'm Gonna Love You Too" failed to chart in the U.S. – a stark contrast to the subsequent breakthrough U.S. singles from Parallel Lines, namely "Hanging on the Telephone", "Heart of Glass and "One Way or Another". In The Netherlands, it was the first single from the album as well, being released in September 1978, where it peaked at No. 6. The song was eventually released as a single in a few other countries in late 1979 as the fifth or sixth single from Parallel Lines, after other songs from the album had completed their run in the charts.

Record World said that Blondie "added their own signature sound [to the Buddy Holly original] for a cross-decade effect."

Release history
US 7" (CHS 2251)
"I'm Gonna Love You Too" (Joe B. Mauldin, Norman Petty, Niki Sullivan) – 2:03
"Just Go Away" (Debbie Harry) – 3:21

Holland 7" (15729)
"I'm Gonna Love You Too" (Joe B. Mauldin, Norman Petty, Niki Sullivan) – 2:03
"Fan Mail" (Jimmy Destri) – 2:35

Chart information

Other versions
Adam Faith included the song on his self-titled album released in 1961.

The song was covered by the Hullaballoos in 1964 in a version that reached No. 56 in the U.S.

Jimmy Gilmer of The Fireballs fame covered the song on his 1965 album Buddy's Buddy: Buddy Holly Songs by Jimmy Gilmer.

A live version, recorded by the 13th Floor Elevators, was included as a bonus track on the 2005 re-release of The Psychedelic Sounds of the 13th Floor Elevators from 1966.

Terry Jacks also covered the song on his 1974 album Seasons in the Sun, and also releasing it as a single, which failed to chart in the USA, but made No.7 in Canada.

In 2007, a home video of Paul McCartney singing an acoustic version of this song was put on the chronology menu of the first disc of his DVD, The McCartney Years.

Denny Laine, guitarist of Wings and the Moody Blues, covered the song on his tribute album Holly Days (1977), produced by Paul McCartney.

In 2012, Jenny O. covered the song on the tribute album Rave on Buddy Holly.

References

1957 songs
1957 singles
1978 singles
Buddy Holly songs
Blondie (band) songs
Songs written by Norman Petty
Song recordings produced by Mike Chapman
Chrysalis Records singles